Municipal Corporation of Panipat or Panipat Municipal Corporation is responsible for the civic administration of the UA city Panipat in Panipat district, Haryana, India. This was a municipal council established in 1867.In 2010 this was converted as Municipal Corporation. Municipal Corporation mechanism in India was introduced during British Rule with formation of municipal corporation in Madras (Chennai) in 1688, later followed by municipal corporations in Bombay (Mumbai) and Calcutta (Kolkata) by 1762. Panipat Municipal Corporation has been formed with functions to improve the infrastructure of town.

History and administration 

Panipat Municipal Corporation was formed  to improve the infrastructure of the town as per the needs of local population.
Panipat Municipal Corporation has been categorised into  wards and each ward is headed by councillor for which elections are held every 5 years.

Panipat Municipal Corporation is governed by mayor and administered by Municipal Commissioner Yashender Singh.

Geography 

References

2010 establishments in Haryana
Municipal corporations in Haryana
Panipat